John Aleyn (died 1373) was Canon of Windsor and Archdeacon of Suffolk.

John Aleyn may also refer to:

John Aleyn (MP), Member of Parliament for Worcestershire
John Aleyn, English law reporter; see Aleyn's Reports

See also 
 John Alleyne (disambiguation)